Janet King is an Australian television drama program which began airing on ABC1 from 27 February 2014. It was created as a spin-off from the 2011 legal drama Crownies. It follows the story of Senior Crown Prosecutor Janet King (Marta Dusseldorp), tracking her journey in Series 1 in the Department of Public Prosecutions to a Royal Commission into Serious Firearm Crime in Series 2 to the National Crime Commission in Series 3.

Various cast members who appeared alongside Dusseldorp in Crownies also appeared in Janet King. A number of new characters were also created. The show was commissioned for an eight part series and filming began in 2013. A second series aired from March 2016, and a third began in May 2017.

Production

Conception
Shortly before the final episode of the ABC1 legal drama Crownies was broadcast in November 2011, David Knox from TV Tonight reported that the series could continue in the form of a spin-off. The drama had suffered from modest ratings and mixed critical reviews during its 22-part run. ABC1 controller, Brendan Dahill explained "Crownies won't be coming back as Crownies. But we are talking to (producers) Screentime about a spin-off. There are lots of things I love about Crownies and lots of things that were done brilliantly, and I'm really proud of Crownies. I'm genuinely surprised it didn't engage a bigger audience than it did. Genuinely surprised. But I don't want to throw the baby out with the bathwater. There are plenty of brilliant things in it and we're talking to Screentime at the moment."

Dahill stated that the spin-off would not be season two of Crownies and that it would take the characters in different directions. He told Knox that there were certain elements of Crownies that worked well and he did not want to lose them because of poor ratings. He continued "So what Screentime have come up with is a really great compromise that allows us to keep the best bits, and learn and move on." Knox added that a spin-off is rare in Australian television drama, but not unprecedented. On 20 August 2012, ABC TV confirmed that it had commissioned the Crownies spin-off, Janet King. The series was billed as an 8-part legal and political thriller. Janet King was produced by Karl Zwicky, Jane Allen and Lisa Scott, with Hilary Bonney acting as story consultant. Greg Haddrick, Jane Allen, Kris Mrksa and Shaun Grant wrote the series.

Dahill said he was excited about Janet King and the fresh new direction it would take. Carole Sklan, ABC's Head of Fiction, commented "Screentime has developed an exciting drama series about the fabulous character, Janet King. The series looks at the dilemmas of a contemporary woman who returns to work after a year's maternity leave and is flung into a shocking prosecution that involves layers of intrigue played out at the highest levels of power. Janet King's case leads her through some astounding twists and revelations that impact on her life on every level." Screentime's Des Monaghan said that it had become clear to Screentime and the ABC that viewers had developed "a great deal" of affection for the character of Janet King and the cast of Crownies, so he was "delighted" that there would be a chance to build on that.

On 30 June 2015, it was announced that ABC had renewed Janet King for a second eight-part series. At the ASTRA Conference in September 2016, Dusseldorp confirmed four scripts for the third series had been written. The third series began airing from 25 May 2017, replacing Seven Types of Ambiguity. It focuses on organised crime in the sporting world, with Janet heading up a National Crime Commission investigation. Her former colleague Richard Stirling (Hamish Michael) is now a barrister for some of the athletes involved, while Owen Mitchell (Damian Walshe-Howling) has become the head of the DPP.

Casting

Anthony Soegito from If Magazine revealed that Marta Dusseldorp would return as Janet King, while many of the characters that became established on Crownies would also make appearances. These included; Hamish Michael (Richard Stirling), Ella Scott Lynch (Erin O'Shaughnessy), Andrea Demetriades (Lina Badir), Peter Kowitz (Tony Gillies), Christopher Morris (Andy Campbell), Indiana Evans (Tatum Novak), Jeanette Cronin (Tracey Samuels), Aimee Pedersen (Ashleigh Larsson) and Lewis Fitz-Gerald (David Sinclair). Knox revealed that Vince Colosimo had been cast as Chief Superintendent Jack Rizzoli, while Damian Walshe-Howling was cast as Owen Mitchell, a rising star prosecutor. John Howard, Sonia Todd, Jessica Napier, Deborah Kennedy and Tiriel Mora also have roles in the series. Todd Lasance and Daniel Lissing did not reprise their respective roles as Ben McMahon and Conrad De Groot.

Joining Dusseldorp as title character Janet King for series 2 include former Crownies originals; Hamish Michael (Richard Stirling), Andrea Demetriades (Lina Badir), Christopher Morris (Andy Campbell) and Peter Kowitz (Tony Gillies), as well as, Janet King season one cast members, Damian Walshe-Howling (Owen Mitchell) and Terry Serio (Terry Renner). New faces include Leah Purcell, Philip Quast, Anita Hegh, Aaron Jeffery, Genevieve Hegney, Nicholas Hope and Ewen Leslie.

Dusseldorp, Michael, Demetriades, Morris, Kowitz, Walshe-Howling, Hegh all returned for the third series. Joining them was Don Hany, Robert Mammone, Susie Porter, Andrew Ryan, Huw Higginson, Steve Le Marquand, Arka Das, Adam Demos, Geraldine Viswanathan and Zoe Terakes. John Bach was cast as Janet's estranged father Graham King. Todd Lasance reprised his Crownies role of Ben McMahon.

Filming
The series went into production in early 2013. Grant Brown, Peter Andrikidis, and Ian Watson were hired to direct the episodes. Filming finished by June 2013. It began broadcasting on 27 February 2014. Filming on the second series commenced in October 2015 for 11 weeks. The series was mostly shot in Bankstown, and locations included the former library, the Compass Centre, and Saigon Place. The third series went into production during the week commencing 7 November 2016.

Cast and characters

 Marta Dusseldorp as Janet King
 Vince Colosimo as Chief Superintendent Jack Rizzoli
 Damian Walshe-Howling as Owen Mitchell
 John Howard as Steven Blakely
 Hamish Michael as Richard Stirling
 Ella Scott Lynch as Erin O'Shaughnessy
 Andrea Demetriades as Lina Badir
 Indiana Evans as Tatum Novak
 Jeanette Cronin as Tracey Samuels
 Peter Kowitz as Tony Gillies SC
 Lewis Fitz-Gerald as David Sinclair QC
 Christopher Morris as Andy Campbell
 Aimee Pedersen as Ashleigh Larsson
 Sonia Todd as Gail Jones
 Jessica Napier as Caroline Martin
 Deborah Kennedy as Dianne Vasilich
 Tiriel Mora as Judge Granville Renmark
 Aaron Glenane as Collard
 Akos Armont as Drew Blakely 
 Harriet Dyer as Maya Blakely
 Terry Serio as Terry Renner
 Melissa Bonne as Keisha Gibson
 Peter Mochrie as Geoff Hadley 
Leah Purcell as Heather O'Connor
Anita Hegh as Sergeant Bianca Grieve
Leeanna Walsman as Peta Vickers 
Genevieve Hegney as Deborah Larsson
Philip Quast as Lincoln Priest
Ewen Leslie as Patrick Boccaro
Aaron Jeffery as Simon Hamilton
Gary Sweet as Roger Embry
Don Hany as Clay Nelson
Robert Mammone as Darren Faulkes
Susie Porter as Maxine Reynolds
Andrew Ryan as Flynn Pearce
Huw Higginson as Wayne Page
John Bach as Graham King
Steve Le Marquand as Wes Foster
Arka Das as Ravi Hasan
Adam Demos as Nate Baldwin
Geraldine Viswanathan as Bonnie Mahesh 
Zoe Terakes as Pearl Perati
Jamie Meyer-Williams as Oliver Pittman
Milly Alcock as Cindi Jackson

Episodes

Series overview

Series 1 (2014)

Series 2 (2016)

Series 3 (2017)

Reception
Ben Neutze from Crikey said that Janet was an "audience favourite" from Crownies. He also noted that Dusseldorp's acting profile had been raised following her appearance in A Place to Call Home. He predicted that the combination would secure success for the show and ABC. Ben Pobjie, writing for The Sydney Morning Herald, praised the series for trying "to keep things varied and interesting. Most likely aware of the pitfalls of such a familiar genre, the show moves at a neat pace."

Accolades

Home media
Series 1 was released by ABC and Roadshow Entertainment on a three disc DVD (Region 4, PAL) on 18 April 2014, and released in the U.S. on 21 June 2016. Series 2 was released in the U.S. on 25 October 2016. Series 3 was released in the U.S. on 26 September 2017.

International
In the United States, the series premiered on Acorn TV on 14 March 2016. The show also airs in Denmark, Finland, Iceland and Spain. Although the series has never been shown in the UK, all seasons are available to view on the STV Player, the video on demand service owned by STV, the ITV affiliate in North and Central Scotland.

References

External links
 
 
 

2010s Australian drama television series
2014 Australian television series debuts
Australian political drama television series
Australian legal television series
English-language television shows
Australian LGBT-related television shows
Lesbian-related television shows
Australian television spin-offs
Television shows set in New South Wales
Australian Broadcasting Corporation original programming
Television series by Screentime
2010s LGBT-related drama television series
Television series about prosecutors